Sloppy Seconds is an American punk band.

Sloppy Seconds may also refer to:

 Sloppy seconds, a sexual practice
 Sloppy Seconds (album), a 1972 album by Dr. Hook & the Medicine Show
 Sloppy Seconds, a 1989 album by T.T. Quick
 Sloppy Seconds, two volumes of mixtapes by CunninLynguists
 Sloppy Seconds: The Tucker Max Leftovers, a 2012 book by Tucker Max
 "Sloppy Seconds", a song on the 2013 album Cardboard Castles by George Watsky

See also

 Sloppy (disambiguation)